James Randolph Hubbell (July 13, 1824 – November 26, 1890) was an American politician from Ohio, serving as a Republican member of the U.S. House of Representatives.

He was born in Lincoln Township in Delaware County, Ohio.  After teaching school, he practiced law in London and Delaware, Ohio.  Hubbell served in the Ohio state House of Representatives during the years 1849, 1858–59 and 1862–63.  He was Speaker of that body in 1863.

At the close of the American Civil War, Hubbell was the U.S. representative from Ohio's 8th district from 1865 to 1867.  Later, in 1869, he was a member of the Ohio state Senate.

Hubbell died in Bellville (Richland County), Ohio.  He was buried at Oak Grove Cemetery in Delaware, Ohio.

See also

Edwin N. Hubbell (born 1815, date of death unknown), congressman from New York
Jay Abel Hubbell (1829–1900), congressman from Michigan
William S. Hubbell (1801–1873) congressman from New York

References

External links

Speakers of the Ohio House of Representatives
People from Delaware County, Ohio
Burials at Oak Grove Cemetery, Delaware, Ohio
1824 births
1890 deaths
Republican Party Ohio state senators
19th-century American politicians
Republican Party members of the Ohio House of Representatives
Republican Party members of the United States House of Representatives from Ohio